Lieutenant-Colonel Henry Pleydell Dawnay, 3rd Viscount Downe FRS (8 April 1727 – 9 December 1760), was a British soldier and politician.

Dawnay was the eldest son of the Honourable John Dawnay, son of Henry Dawnay, 2nd Viscount Downe. His mother was Charlotte Louisa, daughter of Robert Pleydell, of Ampney Crucis, Gloucestershire. He succeeded his grandfather in the viscountcy in May 1741, aged 14. As this was an Irish peerage it did not entitle him to a seat in the English House of Lords (although it did entitle him to a seat in the Irish House of Lords). He was consequently eligible for election to the House of Commons and in 1750 he was returned as one of two Knights of the Shire for Yorkshire, a seat he held until his death ten years later. Lord Downe also served in the Seven Years' War as a lieutenant-colonel in the 25th Foot. He fought in the Battle of Minden in 1759 and commanded the regiment in the Battle of Campen in October 1760. He died in December 1760 from wounds received during the latter battle, aged 33.

Lord Downe never married and was succeeded by his younger brother, John.

References

1727 births
1760 deaths
Viscounts in the Peerage of Ireland
King's Own Scottish Borderers officers
British Army personnel of the Seven Years' War
British military personnel killed in the Seven Years' War
Members of the Parliament of Great Britain for English constituencies
British MPs 1747–1754
British MPs 1754–1761
Fellows of the Royal Society
Henry